The Danish Prosecution Service comprises the Director of Public Prosecutions (Rigsadvokaten), the regional prosecutors (Statsadvokaterne) and on the lowest level the chief police constables (Politimestrene).

Purpose
It is the duty of the Prosecution Service to attend to cases as quickly as possible. The Prosecution Service must make sure that offenders are called to account in accordance with the law, but must also ensure that innocent persons are not prosecuted.

Structure

Director of Public Prosecutions
The Director of Public Prosecutions is head of the Prosecution Service, and he conducts prosecutions in criminal cases before the Supreme Court.

Regional Public Prosecutors
Regional public prosecutors attend to criminal cases before the High Courts and superintend the chief constables. It is also regional public prosecutors who deal with complaints against the police and cases concerning compensation for decisions made by chief constables in criminal prosecutions. The Public Prosecutor for Serious Economic Crime attends to cases involving serious financial crime, on a national basis. The Special International Crimes Office attends to crimes committed by foreigners outside Denmark.

Police Districts
Chief constables are prosecutors in the district courts in their respective districts. As they are, at the same time, head of the police district, they are also responsible for police investigations of breaches of the law in the district. The local prosecution service is, in practice, attended to by the attorneys and police officials of the police district.

Law enforcement agencies of Denmark